Sarah Linnea Nova Klang (born 26 August 1992) is a Swedish singer and songwriter. As of 2021, she has released three albums and performed on På spåret, and at the music festival South by Southwest. She is also a Grammis-award winner in the category "Alternative Pop of the Year".

Biography
In high school Sarah Klang performed with an electronica band inspired by Coldplay and Sigur Rós. When she graduated from Uddevalla she stopped performing, but started again in 2016. In the summer of 2016, she released the music single "Sleep", then released the album Love In the Milky Way in 2018. She co-wrote the album with Kevin Andersson who was also a producer. 

In 2018 she performed on the SVT show På spåret, was nominated in the Newcomer of the Year category at the Grammis-gala, and performed at South by Southwest in the U.S. At the Grammis-gala in 2019 she won in the category "Alternative Pop of the Year".

She describes her own music as pop with influences of Americana music and country.

Besides music she has also worked part-time at her fathers Smørrebrød-restaurant. 

Her album "Creamy Blue" has been nominated for IMPALA's European Independent Album of the Year Award (2019).

Discography

Albums

Singles 
 2016: "Sleep"
 From Love in the Milky Way
 2017: "Strangers"
 2017: "Left Me on Fire"
 2017: "Lover"
 2018: "Mind"
 From Creamy Blue
 2019: "Call Me"
 2019: "Endless Sadness"
 2019: "New Day Coming"
 2019: "Creamy Blue"
 2019: "It's Been Heaving Knowing You"
 From Virgo
 2020: "Canyon"
 2020: "Girls"
 2021: "Fever Dream"
 2021: "Anywhere"
 2021: "Love So Cruel"
 2021: "Agony"

References

External links 

Living people
1992 births
Swedish women singers
Singers from Gothenburg
English-language singers from Sweden